Tadhg Murphy may refer to:
 Tadhg Murphy (dual player) (born 1956), Irish hurler and Gaelic footballer for Cork
 Tadhg Óg Murphy (born 1986), his son, Irish hurler for Cork
 Tadhg Murphy (Tipperary hurler) (born 1951), Irish hurler for Tipperary 
 Tadhg Murphy (actor), Irish actor